Aelia Flavia Flaccilla (31 March 356 – 386), was a Roman empress and first wife of the Roman Emperor Theodosius I. She was of Hispanian Roman descent. During her marriage to Theodosius, she gave birth to two sons – future Emperors Arcadius and Honorius – and a daughter, Aelia Pulcheria.

Family
According to Laus Serenae ("In Praise of Serena"), a poem by Claudian, both Serena and Flaccilla were from Hispania.

A passage of Themistius (Oratio XVI, De Saturnino) has been interpreted as identifying Claudius Antonius, Praetorian prefect of Gaul from 376 to 377 and Roman consul in 382, to be her father. However the relation is considered doubtful. In 1967, John Robert Martindale, later one of several article writers in the Prosopography of the Later Roman Empire, suggested that the passage actually identifies Antonius as the brother-in-law of Theodosius. However the passage is vague enough to allow Afranius Syagrius, co-consul of Antonius in 382, to be the brother-in-law in question.

The only kin clearly identified in primary sources was her nephew Nebridius, son of an unnamed sister. He married Salvina, a daughter of Gildo. Their marriage was mentioned by Jerome in his correspondence with Salvina. They had a son and a daughter.

Marriage
In about 375–376, Flaccilla married Theodosius I, a son of Count Theodosius. At the time Theodosius had fallen out of favor with Valentinian I and had withdrawn to civilian life in Cauca, Gallaecia.

Their first son Arcadius was born prior to the elevation of his parents on the throne. Their second son Honorius was born on 9 September 384. Their daughter Pulcheria has been suggested to have been born prior to the elevation of her parents to the throne due to another passage of Laus Serenae. She predeceased her parents as mentioned in the writings of Gregory of Nyssa.

A younger Gratian – mentioned alongside the imperial children by Ambrose – has at times been suggested as a third son; however, Gregory of Nyssa reports the existence of only three imperial children and other sources do not mention Gratian. Gratian was possibly a relation of some sort but  not an actual member of the Theodosian dynasty.

Empress
Valens, emperor of the Eastern Roman Empire was killed in the Battle of Adrianople (9 August 378). He was survived by his wife Albia Dominica and his daughters Anastasia and Carosa. He had however survived his only son, Valentinianus Galates. His nephew Gratian, Emperor of the Western Roman Empire, was his heir and assumed control of the Eastern Empire with his younger half-brother Valentinian II as his nominal co-ruler.

On 19 January, Gratian declared Theodosius, magister militum per Illyricum, to be his new colleague in the Eastern Roman Empire. Theodosius seems to have been the senior officer of Roman origins available for promotion at the time. Merobaudes and Frigeridus, the two magistri militum in praesenti were probably not considered due to their Germanic origins. Several other equivalent positions remained vacant since the deaths of their last holders in Adrianople. At this point Flaccilla became the Empress consort and was given the title Augusta.

She was a fervent supporter of the Nicene Creed. Sozomen reports her preventing a conference between Theodosius and Eunomius of Cyzicus who served as figurehead of Anomoeanism, the most radical sect of Arians, who believed that Jesus was in no way similar to the Father. Ambrose and Gregory of Nyssa praise her Christian virtue and comment on her role as "a leader of justice" and "pillar of the Church".

Theodoret reports on her works of charity, personally tending to the disabled. He quotes her saying that "To distribute money belongs to the imperial dignity, but I offer up for the imperial dignity itself personal service to the Giver." 

She died early in 386. Her death is mentioned by (among others) Claudian, Zosimus, Philostorgius and Joannes Zonaras. According to the Chronicon Paschale, the Palatium Flaccillianum of Constantinople was named in her honor. A statue of her was placed within the Byzantine Senate.

Sainthood
She is commemorated as a saint by the Eastern Orthodox Church, her feast day being 14 September.

References

External links

 Aelia Flaccilla – Catholic Encyclopedia article
 Her profile in the Prosopography of the Later Roman Empire
 Her entry in the Dictionary of Greek and Roman Biography and Mythology
 Coins of Aelia Flaccilla and Numismatic information.

356 births
386 deaths
4th-century Christian saints
4th-century Roman empresses
Flaccilla
Augustae
Christian royal saints
Late Ancient Christian female saints
Romans from Hispania
Theodosian dynasty